Hugo Henrique Assis do Nascimento  or simply  Hugo  (born October 27, 1980, in Rio de Janeiro), is a retired Brazilian attacking midfielder.

Career

On 14 September 2007, he was banned for 120 days from the Brazilian championship - the Campeonato Brasileiro Série A. The Brazilian football disciplinary tribunal imposed the ban after finding the player guilty of ungentlemanly conduct during the 6-0 win over Paraná, when he spat at defender Daniel Marques.

Honours
Tokyo Verdy
 Emperor's Cup: 2004

Corinthians
 Brazilian League: 2005

Grêmio
 Campeonato Gaúcho: 2006, 2010

São Paulo
 Brazilian League: 2007, 2008

Al-Wahda
 UAE Super Cup: 2011

External links

 globoesporte.globo.com
 CBF
 saopaulofc.net
 sambafoot

References

Living people
1980 births
Association football midfielders
Brazilian footballers
Brazilian expatriate footballers
Brazilian expatriate sportspeople in Japan
Brazilian expatriate sportspeople in Mexico
Brazilian expatriate sportspeople in the United Arab Emirates
Expatriate footballers in Japan
Expatriate footballers in Mexico
Expatriate footballers in the United Arab Emirates
Campeonato Brasileiro Série A players
Campeonato Brasileiro Série B players
Campeonato Brasileiro Série C players
J1 League players
J2 League players
UAE Pro League players
Liga MX players
Campo Grande Atlético Clube players
Fluminense FC players
Club Athletico Paranaense players
São Paulo FC players
C.F. Monterrey players
Friburguense Atlético Clube players
CR Flamengo footballers
Esporte Clube Juventude players
Tokyo Verdy players
Sport Club Corinthians Paulista players
Grêmio Foot-Ball Porto Alegrense players
Al-Wakrah SC players
Sport Club do Recife players
Goiás Esporte Clube players
Esporte Clube Vitória players
Thespakusatsu Gunma players
Clube Náutico Capibaribe players
Footballers from Rio de Janeiro (city)